Ernest Gerard Gibson (born October 3, 1961) is a former American football player. He played professionally as a cornerback in the National Football League (NFL) for six seasons, with the New England Patriots from 1984 to 1988 and the Miami Dolphins in 1989. Gibson played college football at Furman University.

Professional career
Gibson was drafted by the New England Patriots in the sixth round of the 1984 NFL Draft playing for them from 1984 to 1988. He was a member of the Super Bowl XX Patriots squad. Gibson played for the Miami Dolphins in his last NFL season in 1989.

Personal life
Gibson currently resides in East Cobb, Georgia and is a business consultant for Chick-fil-A in the Atlanta area.

References

External links
 

1961 births
Living people
American football cornerbacks
American football safeties
Furman Paladins football players
Miami Dolphins players
New England Patriots players
Players of American football from Jacksonville, Florida